László Cseh (born 3 December 1985) is a retired Hungarian competitive swimmer and six-time Olympic medalist.  He is a 33-time European Champion. His father, László Cseh Sr., also represented Hungary at the Olympics in swimming. In 2020 Braden Keith of SwimSwam nominated him as number 1 within top 10 male swimmers who have never won Olympic gold.

Personal
The son of an Olympic swimmer, Cseh started swimming competitively at an early age. Cseh is coached by György Turi and Zoltán Nemes.  He holds a scholarship with the Olympic Solidarity programme.

Swimming career
At the 2003 World Championships, Cseh captured a silver medal in the 400 m individual medley, his first medal at the highest level. He also finished 7th and 13th in the 100 and 200 metres backstroke, all in national record time.

2004 Olympics
Cseh represented Hungary at the 2004 Summer Olympics in Athens, Greece in the 400 m individual medley, 100 m backstroke, and the 200 m individual medley, despite having broken his ankle in the training camp on a stairway a couple of weeks before. Nevertheless, he won a bronze medal in the 400 m individual medley as well as coming in fourth in the 200 m individual medley, and sixth in the 100 m backstroke.

At the 2005 World Championships, Cseh not only improved his national records, he excelled further up in the world rankings, and entered the meet as a serious medal contender in 3 events. After Michael Phelps backed out of the 400 m individual medley, Cseh picked up his first gold medal at the world championships.

Cseh failed to back up his previous performances in the 2007 World Championships, finishing outside the medals in the 400 m individual medley; however he did set a new national record in the 200 m individual medley, along with testing out the 200 m freestyle.

2008 Olympics
Cseh represented Hungary at the 2008 Summer Olympics in Beijing in three swimming events: the 400 m individual medley, the 200 m butterfly, and the 200 m individual medley. Despite setting the European record in all of them, he won the silver medal in each and came in second behind American Michael Phelps, who won each event with a new world record.  In both individual medleys, Cseh came out ahead of the bronze-medal winner Ryan Lochte.

At the 2009 World Championships, Cseh was rushed to hospital on arrival in Rome, suffering from a stomach virus. A source close to the Hungarian team stated: "He has had to have re hydration and electrolyte drinks but is quite sick." He scratched his first event, the 200 m butterfly, however he did return to competition on day 4 setting a European record in the 200 m individual medley, swimming a touch slower the next night to capture silver, final night of competition saw him take bronze in the 400 m individual medley.

At the 2010 European Championships, Cseh held off Markus Rogan for gold in the 200 m individual medley, winning the event for the third time. Also taking gold in the 400 m individual medley for the fourth time. He scratched the European Short Course Championships to focus on the World Short Course Championships where he won a bronze in the 200 m butterfly.

At the 2011 World Championships, he took bronze in the 200 m individual medley, finished 9th in the 100 m butterfly, and 12th in the 200 m butterfly.

2012 Olympics
At the 2012 Olympics, he competed in 6 events: the 200 m butterfly, 200 m individual medley, 400 m individual medley, and the 3 relays. Cseh narrowly failed to reach the final of the 400 meter individual medley, coming in 9th position in the semi-finals. He finished 12th in the 200m butterfly. Cseh did add to his Olympic medal count with a bronze in the 200 meter individual medley, touching the wall in a time of 1:56.22, behind Phelps (gold – 1:54.27) and Lochte (silver – 1:54.90).

At the 2015 World Aquatics Championships, Cseh finally won another gold, 10 years after his first, by winning the 200m butterfly in 1:53.48, 0.2 seconds ahead of Chad le Clos.

2016 Olympics
At the 2016 Olympics, he competed in the 100 m and 200 m butterfly, along with the 4 × 100 m medley relay.

In 100 m butterfly he finished 2nd along with rivals Michael Phelps and Chad le Clos, where Singaporean Joseph Schooling won the race with a new Olympic record. Cseh has now won Olympic silver medals in four different events, and he has also won individual medals in four different Olympics.

2020 Olympics
At the 2020 Olympics, Laszlo Cseh competed in his fifth and last Olympic games, entering in men's 200m IM only. The 35-year-old Hungarian stopped the clock in a time of 1:57.68 to finish 7th in the race, after the race he announced retirement from competitive swimming, ending his legendary career as 6-time Olympic medalist and 13-time World Champ medalist.

Career best times
Cseh has broken five short course world records and progressively lowered numerous European records in his career.

Awards
 Hungarian swimmer of the Year (9): 2003, 2005, 2006, 2007, 2008, 2010, 2014, 2015, 2016
   Cross of Merit of the Republic of Hungary – Golden Cross (2004)
 Swimming World Magazine – European Swimmer of the Year (2): 2005, 2006
 Hungarian Athlete of the Year (1) - the National Sports Association (NSSZ) awards: 2006
 Budapest Pro Urbe award (2006)
 Hungarian Sportsman of the Year (2) - votes of sports journalists: 2006, 2015
 Junior Príma award (2007)
   Order of Merit of the Republic of Hungary – Officer's Cross (2008)
 Honorary Citizen of Balatonalmádi (2008)
 Príma Primissima award (2009)
 Honorary Citizen of Kőbánya (2011)
   Order of Merit of Hungary – Commander's Cross (2012)
 Hungarian university athlete of the year (1): 2015
 Hungarian Heritage Award (2015)
 European swimmer of the year (LEN) (2015)
 Honorary Citizen of Eger (2016)
   Order of Merit of Hungary – Commander's Cross with Star (2016)

References

External links
 
 
 
 
 
  

1985 births
Living people
Hungarian male swimmers
Olympic swimmers of Hungary
Male butterfly swimmers
Male backstroke swimmers
Male medley swimmers
Swimmers at the 2004 Summer Olympics
Swimmers at the 2008 Summer Olympics
Swimmers at the 2012 Summer Olympics
Swimmers at the 2016 Summer Olympics
Swimmers at the 2020 Summer Olympics
Olympic silver medalists for Hungary
Olympic bronze medalists for Hungary
Swimmers from Budapest
World record setters in swimming
Olympic bronze medalists in swimming
World Aquatics Championships medalists in swimming
Medalists at the FINA World Swimming Championships (25 m)
European Aquatics Championships medalists in swimming
Medalists at the 2012 Summer Olympics
Medalists at the 2008 Summer Olympics
Medalists at the 2016 Summer Olympics
European champions for Hungary
People from Halásztelek
Medalists at the 2004 Summer Olympics
Olympic silver medalists in swimming
Universiade medalists in swimming
Universiade gold medalists for Hungary
Medalists at the 2011 Summer Universiade
20th-century Hungarian people
21st-century Hungarian people